Biskamzha (Khakas: , Pis Xamcı) is an urban-type settlement in Askizsky District of the Republic of Khakassia, Russia. Population: .

Biskamzha railway station is on the route from Abakan to Novokuznetsk. Two local trains to Abakan and Mezhdurechensk depart from here. Also, the night sleeper train Abakan - Barnaul passes through this station.

References

Notes

Sources

Urban-type settlements in Khakassia